Affairs of State is a 1950 Broadway comedy written and directed by Louis Verneuil. It opened at the Royale Theatre, then moved to the Music Box Theatre and played for a total of 610 performances.

It was the first play Verneuil wrote in English.

Cast
 Celeste Holm - Irene Elliott 	 
 Harry Bannister - Byron Winkler 	 
 Elmer Brown - Lawrence 	 
 Barbara O'Neil - Constance Russell 	 
 Reginald Owen - Philip Russell 	 
 Shepperd Strudwick - George Henderson

References

"Affairs of State: Celeste Holm is Starred in a French Farce that has a Washington Setting" by Brooks Atkinson, The New York Times, October 1, 1950
"Affairs of State to Arrive September 25th" by Louis Calta, The New York Times, August 24, 1950

External links
Affairs of State at IBDB

1950 plays
Broadway plays
Plays by Louis Verneuil